All3Media Limited is a British worldwide independent television, film and digital production and distribution company based in London, England. The All3Media group comprises more than 40 production and distribution companies from across the United Kingdom and all other parts of Europe (IDTV in the Netherlands and All3Media Deutschland in Germany), New Zealand (South Pacific Pictures) and the United States.

History 
The company was formed in 2003 after the Chrysalis's television arm was acquired by a consortium led by ex-Granada chief Steve Morrison, former ITV Head of Programming, David Liddiment and former Operations MD at Granada, Jules Burns.

In 2013, it was named top UK independent producer, with a turnover of £473m.

On 8 May 2014, it was announced that Discovery, Inc. and Liberty Global would acquire All3Media, in a joint venture valued at US$930 million.

On 24 September 2020, BBC Studios announced their intention to sell their stake in their German joint venture with All3Media, Tower Productions, and launch their own German division, BBC Studios Germany Productions. The sale took effect at the end of 2020.

On 3 December 2020, All3Media acquired Silverback Films, the producer of the Netflix series Our Planet.

On 17 May 2021, it was announced that Discovery, which co-owned All3Media, would be merging with AT&T subsidiary WarnerMedia to form Warner Bros. Discovery.

On 8 April 2022, the merger was completed.

Companies 

As in January 17, 2023, the following are a list of companies owned by All3Media:
All3Media America
Best Production Company (joint venture with Kevin Bartel)
Relevé Entertainment
Woodman Park Productions
All3Media Deutschland
Tower Productions
Bon Voyage Films
Filmpool Entertainment
Filmpool Fiction
South&Browse
The Fiction Syndicate
All3Media International
NENT Studios UK
Aurora Media Worldwide
Bentley Productions Ltd., producer of ITV's Midsomer Murders and Ultimate Force
Bright Spot Content
Bullion Productions
Caravan
Company Pictures
Great Scott Media
IDTV, Netherlands
Lime Pictures
Wise Owl Films
Lion Television
Lion Television Scotland
Lion Television America
Lion Television International
Little Dot Studios
YouTube Channels
Wing (content agency)
History Hit (streaming service created by Dan Snow)
Maverick Television
Neal Street Productions
New Pictures
Witchery Pictures (joint venture with Siobhan Finnigan and Judith King)
North One Television
Objective Media Group (OMG)
Betty
Objective Fiction (scripted comedies and comedy-dramas)
Tannadice Pictures (joint venture with Neil Forsyth)
OMG America, Los Angeles, California
OMG North/Purple Productions, Manchester, England
Triple Brew Media (live and recorded quiz and gameshow programming)
OMG Scotland, in Glasgow
141 Productions
Canard
Optomen
Optomen Entertainment, Los Angeles, California
Raw TV
Seven Stories
Silverback Films
South Pacific Pictures, New Zealand
Kura Productions (joint venture with Quinton Hita)
Satellite Media (mixed-media production company)
Studio Lambert, United States/United Kingdom
Two Brothers Pictures
Unstoppable Film and TV (as in 17 January, 2023, run by Noel Clarke and Jason Maza)
West Road Pictures

Important rights held

 Call the Midwife
 The Circle
 The Cube
 Fleabag
 The Gadget Show
 Gogglebox
 Great British Menu
 Hollyoaks
 Homes Under the Hammer
 Horrible Histories
 Lingo
 Midsommer Murders
 The Max Headroom character - held by All3Media .
 Operation Ouch!
 Peep Show
 Shameless (UK)
 Shortland Street
 Skins (UK)
 ''Undercover Boss

See also

 List of All3Media television programmes

References

External links
 

 
Television production companies of the United Kingdom
Permira companies
Warner Bros. Discovery subsidiaries
Liberty Global
Joint ventures
Entertainment companies established in 2003
Mass media companies established in 2003
British companies established in 2003
Mass media companies based in London